Carol Z. Garrison was the 6th President of the University of Alabama at Birmingham. The Board of Trustees of the University of Alabama System unanimously voted to appoint her to the office on July 23, 2002. She stepped down from presidency on August 16, 2012.

She is a member of Phi Beta Kappa, Sigma Xi, and Delta Omega. She was twice honored as the Carolina Distinguished Professor.

Prior employment
 1976-1978 – Assistant Professor of Nursing, University of Alabama at Birmingham
 1978-1982 – Assistant Professor, University of North Carolina at Chapel Hill
 1982-1992 – Faculty Member, University of South Carolina
 1992-1994 – Professor & Chair of Epidemiology and Biostatistics, University of South Carolina
 1994-1997 – Associate Provost & Dean of the Graduate School, University of South Carolina
 1997-2002 – Provost, University of Louisville
 2002-2002 – Acting president, University of Louisville

Education
 1974 – Bachelor's Degree, University of North Carolina at Chapel Hill
 1976 – Master's Degree, UAB School of Nursing
 1978 – Pediatric Nurse Practitioner Certificate, UAB School of Nursing
 1982 – Ph.D. in Epidemiology, University of North Carolina at Chapel Hill

References

 
 

1952 births
Living people
American nursing administrators
People from Birmingham, Alabama
UNC Gillings School of Global Public Health alumni
University of North Carolina at Chapel Hill faculty
Presidents of the University of Alabama at Birmingham
Presidents of the University of Louisville
University of Alabama at Birmingham faculty
Nursing educators
Advanced practice registered nurses